Polyidaceae is a red algae family in the order Gigartinales.

External links
Polyidaceae at AlgaeBase

Gigartinales
Red algae families